Denis Philip Bovey (born 1929) was Provost of St Andrew's Cathedral, Aberdeen, from 1983 to 2008.

Bovey was educated at Ely Theological College and ordained in 1954. After curacies in Southwick, Sunderland and West Hartlepool, he served in Strichen, Old Deer, Longside and Inverurie.

References

1929 births
Possibly living people
Deans of Aberdeen and Orkney
Alumni of Ely Theological College
20th-century Scottish Episcopalian priests
21st-century Scottish Episcopalian priests